Maura Clarke, MM (January 13, 1931 – December 2, 1980), was an American Catholic Maryknoll sister who served as a missionary in Nicaragua and El Salvador. She worked with the poor and refugees in Central America from 1959 until her murder in 1980. On December 2, 1980, she was beaten, raped, and murdered along with three fellow missionaries —  Ita Ford, Dorothy Kazel and Jean Donovan —  by members of the military of El Salvador.

Murder

See also
 Maryknoll Sisters of St. Dominic
 Death squad
Los Horcones massacre
CECIM

References

Further reading
A Radical Faith: The Assassination of Sr. Maura, Eileen Markey, NationBooks 2016.
Hearts on Fire: The Story of the Maryknoll Sisters, Penny Lernoux, et al., Orbis Books, 1995.
Ita Ford: Missionary Martyr, Phyllis Zagano, Paulist Press, 1996.
The Same Fate As the Poor, Judith M. Noone, Orbis Books, 1995. 
Witness of Hope: The Persecution of Christians in Latin America, Martin Lange and Reinhold Iblacker, Orbis Books, 1981.

External links
Ford v. Garcia Trial Background. Legal history section of PBS website on "Justice and the Generals" presentation in 2002.  Accessed October 7, 2005.
The Maura Clarke – Ita Ford Center of Brooklyn, New York.
Martyrdom in El Salvador  Maryknoll Sisters website. Accessed October 7, 2005.
Plant a Tree in Ita Ford's Memory Memorial program in El Salvador in honor of the four churchwomen; accessed December 9, 2006.
Report of the Commission on the Truth for El Salvador (1993) accessed online December 9, 2006.

1931 births
1980 deaths
20th-century Roman Catholic martyrs
American people murdered abroad
20th-century American Roman Catholic nuns
American Roman Catholic missionaries
Female Roman Catholic missionaries
Assassinated American activists
Catholic martyrs of El Salvador
Roman Catholic missionaries in El Salvador
Roman Catholic missionaries in Nicaragua
Deaths by firearm in El Salvador
Maryknoll Sisters
People from Queens, New York
People murdered in El Salvador
Roman Catholic activists
People of the Salvadoran Civil War
Burials in El Salvador
1980 murders of U.S. missionaries in El Salvador
Activists from New York (state)
Catholics from New York (state)